Turkic nationalism may refer to:

Turkish nationalism
Pan-Turkism
Turanism